Yadavrao Tasgaonkar Institute of Engineering & Technology is an engineering college located in Bhivpuri Road, Karjat of Raigad district. It is a private engineering college founded in 2005-06 by Dr. Nandkumar Yadavrao Tasgaonkar and is a part of the Saraswati Education Society.

The college has seven departments: Computer Engineering, Electrical Engineering, Electronics, Electronics and Telecommunications Engineering, Civil Engineering, Mechanical Engineering and Bio Medical Engineering.

Campus
The campus is located in the foothills of Matheran, on a 125-acre campus. Facilities include:

 Library 
 Fully equipped laboratories
 Swimming pool
 Sports room
 Cafeteria
 Lawns
 Gazebos
 Tennis court
 Volleyball court
 Basketball court
 Football ground
 Computer room
 Workshop area
 Auditorium
 Quadrangle
 Vitthal mandir
 Water coolers
 Hostel

Intakes

Festivals

Aagman
Aagman is the fresher’s party for students of F.E & DSE. The main aim of this party is to give a warm welcome to the newcomers. It is accompanied with many colourful events and programs like ramp walk, traditional, fusion, and western dances, exhilarating singing performances, and splendid decoration.

Crystal
Crystal is an annual cultural festival of the college held in the even semesters.

Area 244
Area 244 is an annual intercollegiate technical festival of the college held in February or March. Every year thousands of students participate in this event from all across Mumbai region. http://www.area244.org

Hostels

Hostel facilities are provided in general for outstation students. However, if accommodation is still available after allotments, then students located far off from Bhivpuri Road, Karjat but within Mumbai and Navi Mumbai are also considered.  The hostel facilities are provided separately for girls and boys with not more than three students per room.  The hostels are self-sufficient with facilities like catering, sports, television, medical, dhobi, barber, etc. Banking facilities are being planned within campus.

 Sweepers are available to clean the room.
 Iron is officially allowed to use. 
 LPG stove is provided in the hostel for the girls to prepare tea and is available for individual blocks.
 Water is available 24 hours.
 Fax machine is available.
 Courier service is provided.
 Cease fire is available separately for hostel.
 Generator backup is available 24 hrs.
 Wifi is available

Hostel Capacity
 For Girls-82 Rooms & more under construction
 For Boys-129 Rooms & more under construction

Principal and campus directors

Placements
The major objective of placement cell is to identify the talented and qualified professionals before they complete their education. They provide employment opportunities to students who are pursuing or in the final stage of completing the course. Various aptitude tests are conducted throughout the year.

Sister institutes

 Saraswati Education Society
 Yadavrao Tasgaonkar College of Engineering & Management (YTCEM)
 Saraswati Education Society Group of Institutions, Faculty of Engineering

See also
University of Mumbai
List of Mumbai Colleges

External links
Official Website
University of Mumbai

Educational institutions established in 2005
Engineering colleges in Maharashtra
Engineering colleges in Mumbai
Affiliates of the University of Mumbai
Education in Raigad district
2005 establishments in Maharashtra